Medborgarplatsen, formerly known as Södra Bantorget, is a station on the Green line of the Stockholm metro. The station has a single island platform, which is accessed by entrances at the junction of Götgatan with Folkungagatan, and in the Björns trädgård.

Medborgarplatsen is, along with Skanstull, the oldest underground station on the metro, actually predating that system by some years. Originally known as Södra Bantorget, the station took its current name in 1944. In 1950, it became part of Stockholm's first metro line when the Södertunneln was adapted to become part of the line from Slussen south to Hökarängen. This adaption required an extension of the station platforms to the north to accommodate the metro's trains, and this work was not completed when the line opened on 1 October, with the station not reopening until 1 November. The entance in the Björns trädgård was opened on 29 November 1995.

The walls of the station have yellow tiles, partly original from the 1930s. As part of Art in the Stockholm metro project,  designed the color scheme of the pillars and walls in 1979.

Gallery

References

External links
Images of Medborgarplatsen

Green line (Stockholm metro) stations
Railway stations opened in 1933
Railway stations opened in 1950
1933 establishments in Sweden
1950 establishments in Sweden